The World Triathlon Mixed Relay Championships, is an annual team triathlon competition organized by World Triathlon. The competition is completed in teams of four, two men and two women, with each member doing a super-sprint distance triathlon.

History
The first relay event appeared in 2003  in Tiszaújváros, Hungary as the ITU Team Relay Championships, two races were run one for men's teams and one for women's teams every team would have three members  who would each complete one leg and the teams combined time would be their total time. Despite being deemed a success the event would not return until 2006. The championship would return in 2006 and 2007 before once again lacking an annual competition in 2008. In 2009, World Triathlon (then known as the International Triathlon Union or ITU) went through a major reorganization of its top level competitions, the men's and women's relay championships where merged and the title would be contested as a mixed relay. The event was initiated with the aim of getting more triathletes as well as the team triathlon discipline on the Olympic programme.

The format appeared at the 2010 Summer Youth Olympics, the 2014 Commonwealth Games and the 2014 Asian Games, which was considered a significant step towards adding team triathlon to the 2016 Summer Olympic programme. In July 2013, the IOC executive board ruled that they would not add any new disciplines to the 2016 games for fear of putting additional financial pressure on Brazil. In June 2017 with the announcement of mixed gender events being added to the Olympic program the mixed team relay has gained Olympic status and will hold its inaugural Olympic event in the 2020 Olympics. In 2018 it was decided that at three of the events of that years World Triathlon Series would also host a mixed relay event would be held alongside the men's and women's competition one of these would be the World Championship and all three events would grant points towards Olympic qualification and constitute the new mixed relay series. In 2019 the number of mixed relays in World Triathlon Series were increased to five and once again one of these would be the World Championship.

In 2021 the Mixed Relay World Championships were awarded to Bermuda, with the intent of holding a combined World Triathlon Sprint & Mixed Relay Championships, which would also mark the return of a stand alone Sprint Championship after a ten year hiatus. However, the Bermuda event was cancelled due to Covid-19 restrictions, and the inaugural combined event was instead held as the Montréal leg of the 2022 World Triathlon Championship Series. The event doubled as the first qualifier for the 2024 Summer Olympics, and also included the first age-group mixed relay world championships.

Results

4 x 4 Mixed relay

Team Relay Championships
Before the creation of the mixed team relay, single gendered relay races were held intermittently.

Men's championship

Women's championship

References 

Relay, Mixed
Triathlon world championships
Triathlon